Friday Bridge is a Swedish pop band. The band has released two EPs and two albums since 2004. Friday Bridge's sound has been described as a mix between 1980s electronic pop and music from the 18th century - particularly referring to the use of harpsichord. The band is named after a village in Cambridgeshire, Great Britain.

Discography 
 The Lady Julie (2004), EP, Best Kept Secret LIE084
 Friday Bridge 2 (2005), EP, Bedroom BED025
 Intricacy (2007), album, But is it Art? ART005
 Bite My Tongue (2009), album, But is it Art? ART012
 Dark Heart (featuring Nicolas Makelberge) (2011), single, But is it Art? ART017

External links
Official site
MySpace site
Label site

References

Swedish musical groups